Greenwood Cemetery is a historic cemetery located in Orlando, Florida.

History

In 1880, eight Orlando residents pulled together to buy 26 acres of land and form Orlando Cemetery. The name was changed to Greenwood Cemetery in 1915 at the request of two of its founders. The cemetery has expanded with land purchases over time and now has 86 acres of land. Sections of the cemetery are dedicated to Confederate veterans, Union veterans, Spanish-American veterans, World War I veterans and World War II veterans.

Moonlight walking tours of the cemetery are popular in Orlando. These tours are led by a sexton and it offers a window into Orlando's history.
The west side of the cemetery contains the 19-acre park, Greenwood Urban Wetlands, which was established in 1991.

A section of the cemetery contains unmarked plots for the victims of lynchings by whites, according to history professor Vibert White. One such victim, July Perry, who was hung in 1920 after trying to vote in Ocoee, received a headstone in 2002.

In the wake of the Pulse nightclub shooting of June 12, 2016, the City of Orlando offered plots for those killed.

Notable burials
 U.S. Senator Charles O. Andrews
 U.S. Rep. William Thomas Bland
 FL Rep. Edna Giles Fuller, first woman to serve in the Florida State Legislature.
 Francis W. Eppes, intendant (mayor) of Tallahassee from 1841–44 & 1856–57. He was also instrumental in founding Florida State University.
 Mayor  Cassius Aurelius Boone
 Mayor Willis Lucullus Palmer
 Mayor John Letcher Bryan
 Mayor James B. Parramore
 Mayor Mahlon Gore
 Mayor James Horace Smith
 Mayor Braxton Beacham
 Mayor Carl Langford
 National Baseball Hall of Famer Joe Tinker
 Journalist and discredited NY Times Pulitzer prize winner Walter Duranty
 Former ShopHQ host, singer and television personality Connie Kunkle

See also
 List of cemeteries in the United States
 List of cemeteries in Florida

References

External links
 
 

Cemeteries in Florida
1880 establishments in Florida
Buildings and structures in Orlando, Florida
Cemeteries established in the 1880s